The 1992 Clásica de San Sebastián was the 12th edition of the Clásica de San Sebastián cycle race and was held on 8 August 1992. The race started and finished in San Sebastián. The race was won by Raúl Alcalá of the PDM team.

General classification

References

1992
1992 in Spanish road cycling
1992 UCI Road World Cup
August 1992 sports events in Europe